Lake Temo is an artificial lake in northern Sardinia, Italy, located in the Province of Sassari.

The dam was built between 1971 and 1984 by the engineer Giorgio Pietrangeli. The reservoir has the function of water supply.

Lakes of Sardinia